Animosity is the fourth album by the band The Berzerker released in 2007. As with the first and third albums, a drum machine was used on the drum parts.

Reception 

Metal Hammer gave it a rating of

Track listing
 "Eye for an Eye" – 2:17
 "Purgatory" – 3:04
 "False Hope" – 3:29
 "Evolution" – 2:47
 "No more Reasons" – 2:45
 "Retribution" – 2:41
 "The Cancer" – 3:09
 "Weapons of War" – 2:31
 "Heavily Medicated" – 2:26
 "Lonely World" – 3:47

The song "Heavily Medicated" was featured in Issue 164 of Metal Hammer magazine.

A Limited Edition was also released with a live bonus disc entitled Live in London. It was recorded on the UK tour at London's Dome on December 16, 2006.

Bonus disc track listing
 "Intro"
 "Forever"
 "Compromise"
 "The Principles and Practices of Embalming"
 ""Y""
 "Never Hated More"
 "World of Tomorrow"
 "Disregard"
 "All About You"
 "Cannibal Rights"
 "Heavily Medicated"
 "Burnt"
 "Afterlife"
 "Chapel of Ghouls" (Morbid Angel cover)
 "Pure Hatred"
 "Deform"
 "No One Wins"
 "Death Reveals"
 "Reality"
 "Committed to Nothing"
 "Corporal Jigsore Quandary" (Carcass cover)

Personnel 
 Luke Kenny — vocals, drum programming
 Jason — guitar and bass

References
 

2007 albums
The Berzerker albums
Earache Records albums